Christopher Hughes (born 5 March 1984) is an English former professional football midfielder.

Hughes previously played for Darlington and Scarborough. He played 45 league games scoring 2 times in 2 years for Darlington between the years of 2003–2005. He also played for Scarborough playing 23 league games scoring 2 times for a year between the year of 2005–2006. Hughes joined Gateshead in 2006 having previously been at Scarborough. Having sustained a bad injury during the 2007–08 season, Hughes was released by Gateshead in May 2008.

Honours

Gateshead
 Northern Premier League Premier Division playoff winner: 2007–08
 Durham Challenge Cup runner-up: 2007–08

References

External links

1984 births
Living people
Footballers from Sunderland
Association football midfielders
English footballers
Darlington F.C. players
Scarborough F.C. players
Gateshead F.C. players
English Football League players
National League (English football) players
Northern Premier League players